Three Chimneys, also known as the Major James Woods House, is a two-and-a-half-story Georgian style historic house in Nelson County, Virginia.

Constructed approximately in 1795, the house is one of the oldest standing brick houses in Nelson County, and was added to the Virginia Landmarks Register in September 2013.

References

External links
 Virginia DHR map of the property
 National Register of Historic Places Registration Form 
 Virginia DHR photographs of the property

Buildings and structures in Nelson County, Virginia